Arutela was a fort in the Roman province of Dacia located on Limes Alutanus. It was erected on 138 by "Surri sagittari" by the order of Titus Flavius Constans, imperial procurator of Dacia Inferior.

The last Roman coin found here was from Elagabal, emitted between 220 - 222.

Images

See also
List of castra

Notes

References

External links

Roman castra from Romania - Google Maps / Earth

Roman legionary fortresses in Romania
History of Oltenia
Historic monuments in Vâlcea County